Lento is the eighth studio album by South Korean jazz singer-songwriter Na Yoon-Sun, released on March 12, 2013 by ACT Music. It is the third album that Yoon-Sun and ACT Music worked on music together. After Yoon-Sun refused to contract with French record label Bleu, she had formed quintet with French accordionist Vincent Peirani, Swedish guitarist Ulf Wakenius, French percussionist Xavier Desandre-Navarre, and Swedish bassist and cellist Lars Danielsson. This quintet has been working together since 2009 when they created Yoon-Sun's sixth album Voyage.

This album's title comes from the Italian word 'lento,' Which means 'performing music slowly.' Yoon-Sun wrote and produced all the songs in "Lento." Indeed, most of the songs which this album contains are slowly paced. In addition, even though she was not originally a jazz musician and had sung various types of music such and rock and classical music, she uses variety of jazz techniques or produces similar effects in her songs in Lento. In this album, she performs scat singing, creates swing feeling, and the quintet plays in A-A-B-A form in some songs while fusing those techniques with other genres.

One remarkable point other than her vocal jazz performance is her rearrangement of Korean traditional folk song Arirang. Na Yoon-Sun sang this jazz version of Arirang at Sochi Winter Olympic closing ceremony in 2014 celebrating South Korea's hosting of the next winter Olympic.

Commercial performance
Lento, after it was released, was commercially successful in several countries in Europe. It has been peaked on #14 in French Leschart and # 70 in Switzerland.
In Germany, Yoon-Sun received German Jazz Gold Award for reaching to #1 in German Chart. She also received ECHO, the German Grammy as the best international jazz singer and most sold-out album.

Track listing

Personnel
 Na Yoon-Sun - Vocal, Producer, Singer-Songwriter
 Vincent Peirani - Accordion
 Lars Danielsson - Bass, Cello
 Xavier Desandre-Navarre - Percussion 
 Ulf Wakenius - Guitar
 Seung Hwan Roh - Design [Album Design]
 Lars Nilsson - Engineer
 Michael Dahlvid - Engineer [Assistant]
 JJ In - Executive-Producer
 Sung Yull Nah - Photography
 Axel Matignon - Producer

References

2013 albums
Na Yoon-sun albums